Entre correr y vivir, is a Mexican television series produced by Julián Antuñano for Azteca 7. The series premiered on October 22, 2016, is also available on the Blim platform. The series is based on the lives of the brothers Ricardo and Pedro Rodríguez de la Vega, famous drivers of the Formula 1 in the 60's.

The series is starring Vadhir Derbez as Rodrigo Hernández, Diego Amozurrutia as Guillermo Aldana, Alejandro Camacho as Mateo and Sofía Sisniega as Camila.

Cast 
 Vadhir Derbez as Rodrigo Hernández
 Diego Amozurrutia as Guillermo Aldana
 Alejandro Camacho as Mateo
 Sofía Sisniega as Camila
 Erika de la Rosa as Angelina
 Javier Díaz Dueñas as Don Pedro
 Luciana Silveyra as Ximena
 Laura Montijano as Eva
 Armando Hernández as Diesel
 Juan Pablo Castañeda as Pedro Rodríguez
 Mauricio Garza as Ricardo Rodriguez
 Germán Valdés III as Lalo
 Tony Marcín as Norma

References

External links 
 

Mexican drama television series
2016 Mexican television series debuts
Azteca 7 original programming
Spanish-language television shows
2016 Mexican television series endings